Palmyra-Macedon High School, known as "Pal-Mac", is a public high school located on the border of Palmyra and Macedon, New York, United States. It is part of the Palmyra-Macedon Central School District which serves the towns of Palmyra and Macedon. The principal is Andrew Wahl. The school colors are red and white.

Academics 
Pal-Mac provides education for grades nine through twelve with classes administered by 50 full-time teachers. A wide variety of specialty classes are offered in arts, music, technology and business; as well as advanced placement and college dual-enrollment opportunities.

Music 
The Pal-Mac Music department consists of one instrumental band, and two vocal performance groups. The Select Choir is the highest level chorus. Students who excel in vocal and musical ability may audition for a limited position in the Select Choir. The Select Choir has a history of high performance in NYSSMA Festivals.

Technology 
The Pal-Mac Technology Department is a rapidly growing aspect of the school. The school offers several courses including Digital Imaging, Woodshop, Architecture, TV Broadcasting and Communications, as well as a Robotics course.  Pal-Mac High is also a PLTW Certified Engineering school, first implementing the curriculum in 1999.

FIRST Robotics 
The FIRST Robotics Competition team at Pal-Mac has participated in several regionals, and competed many times in the final rounds. The Robotics team at Pal-Mac is a rapidly growing Extra-Curricular Activity and Club that utilizes the abilities of student programmers, mechanics, as well as several student-artists and web designers.

Advanced courses 

Palmyra-Macedon High School offers a wide variety of Advanced Placement, International Baccalaureate, and dual enrollment courses. It also has the distinction of being an IB World School since 2002 and currently one of two high schools offering the IB Diploma Programme in Wayne County.

Advanced Placement courses offer students a college level curriculum which can often be transferred as introductory credits in US universities. AP Courses that are offered include: American History, AB Calculus, BC Calculus, Biology, Physics, and World History.
The IB Diploma Program provides an internationally accepted qualification for entry into higher education and is accepted at many universities worldwide. IB courses that are offered include: Biology, English Literature A1, French B, History, Mathematics, Psychology, Spanish B, Theory of Knowledge, and Visual Arts

National rankings 
Newsweek and U.S. News & World Report have both recognized Palmyra-Macedon as one of the top public high schools in America.

Athletics 

The Pal-Mac mascot is the Red Raiders is a red tailed hawk. The Pal-Mac district changed the mascot to the Red Raiders red tailed hawk because the previous mascot (A Native American) was deemed offensive by the Mascot Committee. The former mascot was the Red Devils until 1961. Pal-Mac has a strong tradition of success in many of its Varsity sports, most notably Basketball and Wrestling, winning multiple New York State Championships. Other Varsity sports offered include: Football, Cheerleading, Cross-Country, Golf, Soccer, Swimming, Volleyball, Baseball, Softball, Lacrosse, Tennis, and Track & Field. Pal-Mac offers 22 Varsity sports in all, as well as many Junior Varsity and Modified teams. All Pal-Mac teams participate in Section V of the New York State Public High School Athletic Association.

In 2005, the Pal-Mac boys basketball team won the Class B New York State Championship.  It was the first state championship by a Pal-Mac sports team.  Representative James T. Walsh honored the team, the leading scorer Anthony Hall, and the team coach Chip Tatro, in Congress.

State titles

References

External links 
 Palmyra-Macedon CSD website
 Palmyra-Macedon High School website

Public high schools in New York (state)
Schools in Wayne County, New York
Educational institutions established in 1950
1950 establishments in New York (state)